Aspros Volakas (white rock) is a large white rock, next to Long Beach, on the coast of Crete, near Lambi, in Rethymno regional unit. This rock feature is formally designated as a cape due to the shallow water.

Aspros Volakas is very close to Long Beach. There is another rock that is further away, to the east, called Mavros Volakas.

See also
List of islands of Greece
Mavros Volakas

References

Landforms of Rethymno (regional unit)
Uninhabited islands of Crete
Islands of Greece